Uralic is a language family located in Northern Eurasia, in the countries of Finland, Estonia, Hungary (where Uralic languages are spoken by the majority of the population), in other countries Uralic languages are spoken by a minority of the population, these languages are spoken in far-northern Norway (in most of the Finnmark region and other regions of the far-north), in far-northern Sweden (in some areas of Norrland), and Russia (where Uralic languages are also spoken by a minority of its population, although there is a significant number of speakers in some Federal subjects - republics and autonomous districts or autonomous okrugs of Northern Russia, these languages are spoken in Udmurtia, Komi Republic, Mordvinia, Mari-El, Karelia, in Khanty-Mansi Autonomous Okrug, Yamal-Nenets Autonomous Okrug and Taymyr Autonomous Okrug and also in the former area of Komi-Permyak Autonomous Okrug, now part of the Perm Krai, other areas where Uralic languages are spoken in Russia are for example the Kola Peninsula). In Latvia, in some of the far-northern coastal areas of Courland (Kurzeme) region, a dead Uralic language was spoken: Livonian.

Uralic languages are spoken by about 25 million people. The main Uralic languages in number of speakers are Hungarian (12-13 million), Finnish (5.4 million) and Estonian (1.1 million), that are also national and official languages of sovereign states.

Hypothetical ancestors 
Major proposals for hypothetical relations to other language families and their proto-languages, none of which have gained wide acceptance:

Indo-Uralic
Uralo-Siberian
Uralic-Yukaghir
Eskimo-Uralic

Ancestral 
Proto-Uralic

Samoyedic

Proto-Samoyedic (ancestral)
Nganasan (Tavgy, Tavgi, Tawgi, Tawgi-Samoyed) (Njaʔ / Ŋanasan Næ’) 
Avam
Vadey
Mator (Motor, Taigi, Karagas) (extinct)
Mator proper / Motor
Taygi
Karagas
Core Samoyedic
Nenets-Enets
Nenets (Yurak)
Forest Nenets (Nešaŋ wata)
Tundra Nenets (N’enytsia Wada / Nenyotsya’’ Wada)
Transitional Nenets-Enets
Yurats (extinct)
Enets (Yenets, Yenisei-Samoyed) 
Forest Enets (Bay Ona’ Bazaan)
Tundra Enets (Madu Ona’ Bazaan)
Selkup-Kamas
Selkup (Ostyak-Samoyed) (Šöl’ Qumyt Əty)
Taz Selkup
Tym Selkup
Ket Selkup (not to be confused with Ket)
Kamassian (Kamas, Koibal) (formerly spoken by the Kamasins in the Sayan Mountains, South Central Siberia) (extinct)
Kamas/Kamassian
Koibal/Koybal (Samoyedic Uralic Koybal) (Koibal people shifted to a Turkic language - Khakas)

Ob-Ugric

Proto-Ob-Ugric (ancestral)
Mansi (Vogul) (a group of related languages, not a single language)
Southern Mansi (all extinct)
Chusovaya (spoken in the western slopes of the Ural Mountains, to the east of Kama river, in the European side)
Tagil
Tura
Tavda (Tavdin)
Core Mansi
Central Mansi
Western Mansi (extinct)
Vishera (spoken in the western slopes of the Ural Mountains, to the east of Kama river, in the European side)
Pelym
North Vagilsk
South Vagilsk 
Lower Lozva 
Middle Lozva 
Eastern Mansi (Kondin)
Lower Konda
Middle Konda 
Upper Konda
Jukonda
Northern Mansi (Maan's’i Latyŋ) (base of the standard and literary Mansi language)
Upper Lozva
Sosva
Sygva
Ob
Khanty (Ostyak) (Hantĭ jasaŋ / Khantõ Yasõŋ / Kantõk Yasõŋ) (a group of related languages, not a single language)
Western Khanty
Northern Khanty
Obdorsk/Obdorian (Salekhard Khanty)
Berjozov (Synja, Muzhi, Shurishkar), Kazym, Sherkal (Ob dialects)
Transitional Northern-Southern Khanty
Atlym-Nizyam Khanty
Atlym
Nizyam
Southern Khanty (Irtysh Khanty) (extinct)
Upper Demjanka 
Lower Demjanka
Konda
Cingali
Krasnojarsk
Transitional Western-Eastern Khanty
Salym Khanty
Eastern Khanty
Surgut Khanty
 Jugan
 Malij Jugan
 Pim
 Likrisovskoe
 Tremjugan /  Tromagan
Far Eastern Khanty
 Vakh
 Vasjugan
 Verkhne-Kalimsk
 Vartovskoe

Magyar

Proto-Hungarian (Proto-Magyar)
Old Hungarian (ancestral)
Hungarian (Magyar) (Magyar Nyelv)
Northeast Hungary (Északkeleti)
Palóc (Northwest)  (Hungarian dialect with Cuman = Polovtsian, Khazar, Kabar and Pecheneg Turkic substrates, especially in Jász-Nagykun-Szolnok, in Jászság there is a Hungarian dialect with an Ossetian Sarmatian substrate)
Tisza–Körös (Tiszai)
Southern Great Plain
Southern Transdanubian
Central Transdanubian – Little Hungarian Plain
Western Transdanubian
Transylvanian Plain
Székely (East Transylvanian)
Csángó (West Moldavian Hungarian)

Permic

Proto-Permic (ancestral)
Udmurt (Votyak) (Udmurt kyl)
Southern Udmurt
Northern Udmurt (spoken along Cheptsa River)
Besermyan (spoken by the strongly Turkified Besermyans)
Komi (Komi kyv)
Komi-Permyak (Perem Komi kyv)
Southern 
/v/ type
Kudymkar-Inva
Lower Inva
Southern (/l/ type)
On
Nerdva
Northern 
/l/ type
Upper Lupya
Mysy (former rural council)
Kosa-Kama
Kochevo
Zyuzdino (Afanasyevo)
Yazva
Komi-Yodzyak (Yodzyak, Komi-Jazva, Vishera) (Komi-Yodz kyl)
Komi-Zyryan (Komi, Komi-Zyrian, Zyrian) (basis of the standard literary language) (Komi kyv)
Old Komi (written in the Old Permic script) (extinct)
Syktyvkar
Lower Vychegda 
Central Vychegda 
Luza-Letka
Upper Sysola 
Upper Vychegda 
Pechora
Izhma (spoken by the Izhma Komi)
Vym
Udora

Mari

(Mari dialect continuum)

Proto-Mari (ancestral)
Mari (Cheremis) (Marii jõlme) (a group of related languages, not a single language)
Eastern-Meadow Mari
Eastern Mari 
Meadow Mari (Olykmarla)
Meadow Mari Proper
Sernur-Morkin
Volga
Yoshkar-Olin
Transitional Meadow Mari-Hill Mari
Northwestern Mari (Jůtnṳ̊mäl-käsvel Mare jÿlmÿ)
Yaransk dialect (the largest by number of speakers and spread territory, Northwestern Mari standardized variety)
Kiknur subdialect
Tuzha subdialect
Sanchursk subdialect
Tonshaevo dialect
Lipsha dialect
Sharanga dialect
Hill Mari / Western Mari (Kyryk Mary jÿlmÿ)
Kozymodemyan 
Yaran

Mordvinic

Proto-Mordvinic (ancestral)
Erzya (Erzänj kelj)
Central group (E-I)
Western group (E-II)
Northern group (E-III)
Southeastern group (E-IV)
Far Western group (E-V)
Moksha (Mokšenj kälj)
Central group (M-I)
Western group (M-II)
South-Eastern group (M-III)

Finnic

(Finnic dialect continuum) 
Proto-Finnic (ancestral)
Inland Finnic
South Estonian (Lõuna Eesti kiil)
Eastern South Estonian
Kraasna (extinct)
Ludza (extinct)
Seto
Võro
Leivu (extinct)
Mulgi
Tartu
Coastal Finnic 
Gulf of Riga Finnic
Livonian (Līvõ kēļ / Rānda keel) (extinct)
Courland Livonian (extinct) (with revival attempts)
Salaca Livonian (extinct)
Gulf of Finland Finnic 
Central Finnic 
Estonian (North Estonian) (Eesti keel)
Central Estonian (basis of Standard Estonian but not identical)
Eastern Estonian
Insular Estonian
Western Estonian
Northeastern coastal Estonian (?) (Kirderannikumurre)
Alutaguse dialect
Coastal
Votic (Vad’d’a tšeeli / Mā tšeeli /  / Vadyaa cheli) (nearly extinct)
Eastern Votic (extinct)
Western Votic
Krevinian (extinct)
Northern Finnic 
Finnish (Suomi / Suomen kieli)  
Standard Finnish - Yleiskieli
Fingelska
Colloquial Finnish - Puhekieli - spoken language
Western dialects
Southwestern dialects (Lounaismurteet)
Southern dialect group
Northern dialect group
Southwestern transitional dialects 
Pori region dialects
Ala-Satakunta dialects
dialects of Turku highlands
Somero region dialects
Western Uusimaa dialects
Tavastian dialects (Hämäläismurteet)
Ylä-Satakunta dialects
Heart Tavastian dialects
Southern Tavastian dialects
Southeastern Tavastian dialects
Hollola dialect group
Porvoo dialect group
Iitti dialect group
Southern Botnian (Ostrobothnian) dialects (Eteläpohjalaiset murteet)
Middle and Northern Botnian (Ostrobothnian) dialects (Keski- ja Pohjoispohjalaiset murteet)
Middle Botnian (Ostrobothnian) dialects
Northern Botnian (Ostrobothnian) dialects
Peräpohjola dialects (Peräpohjalaiset murteet) Far-Northern dialects
Tornio dialects ("Meänkieli" in Sweden) (Tornedalian / Tornedalian Finnish)
Kemi dialects
Kemijärvi dialects
Jällivaara dialects ("Meänkieli" in Sweden) (Tornedalian / Tornedalian Finnish)
Ruija dialects ("Kven language" in Northern Norway) (Kven Finnish) (Kvääni / Kväänin kieli / Kainu / Kainun kieli)
Eastern dialects
Savonian dialects (Savolaismurteet)
Northern Savonian dialects
Southern Savonian dialects
Middle dialects of Savonlinna region
Eastern Savonian dialects or the dialects of North Karelia
Kainuu dialects
Central Finland dialects
Päijänne Tavastia dialects
Keuruu-Evijärvi dialects
Savonian dialects of Värmland (Sweden) (once spoken by the Forest Finns - Metsäsuomalaiset)
Southeastern dialects (Kaakkoismurteet)
Proper Southeastern dialects
Middle dialects of Lemi region
Ingrian dialects (in Russia)
Ingrian (Ižoran keel)
Hevaha (extinct)
Lower Luga
Kukkozi dialect (?) (nearly extinct)
Orodezhi (Upper Luga) (extinct)
Soikkola dialect
Karelian (Karjala / Kariela / Karjalan kielii) (not to be confused with the Karelian dialects of Finnish although there is some dialect continuum between the two)
Livvi (Olonets Karelian) (Livvi / Livvin kieli)
Karelian proper (Karjala / Kariela / Karjalan kielii)
Northern Karelian (Viena)
Southern Karelian
 Ludic–Veps
Ludic (Lüüdi / Lüüdi kiel)
Northern Ludic
Central Ludic
Kuuďärv Ludic
Veps (Vepsän kelʹ / Vepsän keli)
Northern Veps (Onega Veps)
Central Veps
Southern Veps

Sami

(Sami dialect continuum)
Proto-Sami (ancestral)
Eastern Sami
Mainland 
Inari Sami (Anarâškielâ)
Kemi Sami (extinct)
Skolt Sami (Sääʹmǩiõll / Nuõrttsääʹmǩiõll)
Akkala Sami (extinct) (Sám kiöl)
Kainuu Sami (extinct) 
Peninsular (Kola Sámi)
Kildin Sami
Ter Sami (Saa´mekiil)
Western Sami languages
Northwestern
Northern Sami (Davvisámegiella)
Torne Sami
Finnmark Sami
Sea Sami
Northwestern proper 
Lule Sami (Julevsámegiella)
Northern dialects: Sörkaitum, Sirkas and Jåkkåkaska in Sweden, Tysfjord in Norway
Southern dialects: Tuorpon in Sweden
Forest dialects: Gällivare and Serri in Sweden
Pite Sami (Bidumsámegiella)
Northern dialects: Luokta-Mávas in Sweden
Central dialects: Semisjaur-Njarg in Sweden
Southern dialects: Svaipa in Sweden
Southwestern 
Ume Sami (Ubmejesámiengiälla)
Northwestern
Southeastern
Southern Sami (Åarjelsaemien gïele)
Åsele dialect (Northern dialect)
Jämtland dialect (Southern dialect)

Unclassified Uralic languages (all extinct)

Uralic languages whose relationship to other languages in the family is unclear

Merya (spoken by the Merya, may have been a western branch of the Mari or close to the Mordvinic languages, may have been a transitional language between the Volga and the Baltic Finns)
Meshcherian (spoken by the Meshchera, may have been related to the Mordvinic languages or to the Permic languages)
Murom (spoken by the Muroma, may have been a language close to the Merya and a transitional language between the Volga and the Baltic Finns)

See also
Uralic languages

References
 Abondolo, Daniel M. (editor). 1998. The Uralic Languages. London and New York: Routledge. .
 Collinder, Björn. 1955. Fenno-Ugric Vocabulary: An Etymological Dictionary of the Uralic Languages. (Collective work.) Stockholm: Almqvist & Viksell. (Second, revised edition: Hamburg: Helmut Buske Verlag, 1977.)
 Collinder, Björn. 1957. Survey of the Uralic Languages. Stockholm.
 Collinder, Björn. 1960. Comparative Grammar of the Uralic Languages. Stockholm: Almqvist & Wiksell
 Comrie, Bernhard. 1988. "General Features of the Uralic Languages."  In The Uralic Languages, edited by Denis Sinor, pp. 451–477. Leiden: Brill.
 Décsy, Gyula. 1990. The Uralic Protolanguage: A Comprehensive Reconstruction. Bloomington, Indiana.
 Hajdu, Péter. 1963. Finnugor népek és nyelvek. Budapest: Gondolat kiadó.
 Helimski, Eugene. Comparative Linguistics, Uralic Studies. Lectures and Articles. Moscow. 2000.
 Laakso, Johanna. 1992. Uralilaiset kansat ('Uralic Peoples'). Porvoo – Helsinki – Juva. .
 Korhonen, Mikko. 1986. Finno-Ugrian Language Studies in Finland 1828-1918. Helsinki: Societas Scientiarum Fennica. .
 Napolskikh, Vladimir. The First Stages of Origin of People of Uralic Language Family: Material of Mythological Reconstruction. Moscow, 1991.
 Rédei, Károly (editor). 1986–88. Uralisches etymologisches Wörterbuch ('Uralic Etymological Dictionary'). Budapest.

External classification
 Sauvageot, Aurélien. 1930. Recherches sur le vocabulaire des langues ouralo-altaïques ('Research on the Vocabulary of the Uralo-Altaic Languages'). Paris.

Linguistic issues
 Künnap, A. 2000. Contact-induced Perspectives in Uralic Linguistics. LINCOM Studies in Asian Linguistics 39. München: LINCOM Europa. .
 Wickman, Bo. 1955. The Form of the Object in the Uralic Languages. Uppsala: Lundequistska bokhandeln.

External links

 "The Finno-Ugrics" The Economist, December 20, 2005
 Kulonen, Ulla-Maija: Origin of Finnish and related languages. thisisFINLAND, Finland Promotion Board. Cited 30.10.2009.

 
Uralic